Çağla Şıkel (born 2 January 1979) is a Turkish model, actress and TV presenter.

Early life 
Çağla Şıkel was born on 2 January 1979 in Istanbul as the second child of Asuman and Hüseyin Şıkel. Her father was a financial advisor of Azerbaijani descent, while her mother was a housewife of Circassian descent. She has an elder sister named Berna.

Career 

Şıkel won Miss Turkey beauty competition in 1997. She also took ballet lessons at a young age. During 10–11 August 2013, she returned to the stage after 16 years, and performed the "Bach Alla Turca" ballet together with Samsun State Opera and Ballet dancers at the 11th International Bodrum Ballet Festival. Şıkel is also a blogger and regularly publishes videos on her YouTube channel.

Personal life 
In 2002, Şıkel was in a relationship with fellow model Bozok Gören. She was later linked to Beyazıt Öztürk.

Şıkel later dated pop singer Emre Altuğ before marrying him on 10 August 2008. Şıkel announced her first pregnancy on 18 December 2008, but at the same week she had a miscarriage due to a period of illness. On 31 October 2010, she gave birth to her first son Kuzey. They have another son named Uzay, born in 2012. The couple divorced on 12 January 2015.

Filmography 
As actress
 Görgüsüzler (Sultan) (2008)
 Cennet Mahallesi (Sultan Erdağı) (2004–2007)
 Avrupa Yakası (Melek)
 Zehirli Çiçek
 Bugün Ne Giysem
 Dostlar Mahallesi (2017)
 Jet Sosyete (Herself) (2017; episode 3)

As presenter
 Aile Boyu
 Şehirler Yarışıyor
 İlle de Roman Olsun
 Her şey Dahil (2013–?)
 Tabu (contest)
 Her Şey Dahil
 Kız Tarafı Erkek Tarafı (2015)
 Ben Söylerim (2017)
 Çağla ile Yeni Bir Gün (2018–)

Music videos
 "O'nun Vedası" – Singer: Yaşar (1996)
 "Çiçeklendim" – Singer: Emel Müftüoğlu (1998)
 "Benimle Evlenir misin?" – Singer: Çelik (1998)
 "Ölümsüz Aşklar" – Singer: Alişan (2016)

Commercials
 Clear (2009)
 ABC (2010)
 Hepsiburada.com (2014)
 Vernel (2014)
 Enpara.com (2017)

References

External links 
 

1979 births
Actresses from Istanbul
Turkish television actresses
Turkish female models
Turkish television presenters
Women video bloggers
Turkish people of Azerbaijani descent
Turkish people of Circassian descent
Miss Turkey winners
Living people
Turkish bloggers
Turkish women bloggers
Turkish women television presenters
Miss World 1997 delegates